Kapagal is a village in the Manvi taluk of Raichur district in the Indian state of Karnataka.
Kapagal is well connected by road and it lies on Karnataka State highway 19. Kapagal is 8 km from Manvi and 40 km from District Headquarters Raichur. Nearest major railway station is in Raichur.

Demographics
 India census, Kapagal had a population of 2,673 with 1,355 males and 1,318 females and 475 Households.

See also
 Manvi
 Sindhanur
 Lingasugur
 Raichur
 Karnataka

References

Villages in Raichur district